Radeon 7000 series may refer to:
 AMD Radeon RX 7000 series, a computer graphics card series introduced in 2022
 AMD ATI Radeon HD 7000 series, a computer graphics card series from 2012
 ATI Radeon 7000, a computer graphics card series from 2001